The 1939 Monmouth by-election was a by-election held for the British House of Commons constituency of Monmouth in Wales on 25 July 1939.

Vacancy
The Conservative MP John Herbert had resigned his seat on 1 July 1939, having been appointed as Governor of Bengal.

Previous result

Candidates 
The Conservative candidate was 55-year-old Leslie Pym, who had not had previously contested a parliamentary election.

The Labour Party candidate at the 1935 general election had been 22-year-old Michael Foot, who later became Leader of the Labour Party. Foot did not contest the by-election, when the Labour candidate was F.R. Hancock, who had been unsuccessful in Salisbury at the 1929 general election and at a by-election in 1931. He had also been an unsuccessful candidate in Lewes at the 1931 and 1935 general elections. He was also a Quaker and thus opposed to all war.

Result
On a slightly reduced turnout, Pym held the seat for the Conservatives, with a reduced but still large majority of 5,815.

Aftermath

Pym was re-elected at the 1945 general election, but died five days later.

See also
Monmouth (UK Parliament constituency)
Monmouth
1934 Monmouth by-election
1945 Monmouth by-election
1991 Monmouth by-election
List of United Kingdom by-elections (1931–1950)

References

Further reading
 
 
 A Vision Of Britain Through Time (Constituency elector numbers)

By-elections to the Parliament of the United Kingdom in Welsh constituencies
1939 in Wales
1930s elections in Wales
1939 elections in the United Kingdom
Elections in Monmouthshire
History of Monmouth, Wales
20th century in Monmouthshire